Yvonne Boyer (born October 25, 1953) is a Canadian lawyer who was named to the Senate of Canada on March 25, 2018, as a Senator for Ontario by Prime Minister Justin Trudeau. A Métis, Boyer is the first Indigenous person appointed to the Senate from Ontario. She lives in Merrickville, Ontario, near Ottawa.

As a lawyer, Boyer has been outspoken in her criticisms of inequities in Canada's health care in its treatment of and availability to Indigenous peoples.

Boyer is a member of the Métis Nation of Ontario and has ancestral roots in the Métis Nation of Saskatchewan and Red River, Manitoba. As well as being a lawyer, at the time of her appointment to the Upper House she was a professor in the law faculty at the University of Ottawa and associate director at the school's Centre for Health Law, Policy and Ethics. She is also a former member of the Canadian Human Rights Commission and has also served as in-house counsel for the Native Women's Association of Canada, and as a senior policy analyst and legal adviser at the National Aboriginal Health Organization.

Boyer's appointment to the Senate was recommended by the Independent Advisory Board for Senate Appointments.

Activity
In May 2022 together with two other senators Senator Boyer issued a report calling for a review of the convictions of 12 indigenous women, including the Quewezance sisters, and their exoneration.

References

21st-century Canadian lawyers
Living people
Canadian women lawyers
Canadian senators from Ontario
Women members of the Senate of Canada
Indigenous Canadian senators
Independent Canadian senators
Canadian Métis people
Academic staff of the University of Ottawa
21st-century Canadian politicians
21st-century Canadian women politicians
Independent Senators Group
1953 births
First Nations academics
21st-century women lawyers
First Nations women in politics